Old Sandwich Road is a road in Plymouth, Massachusetts and is the second oldest public road in the United States. First used as a path by Wampanoag members, the road has been gradually upgraded over the years to become a main road. Old Sandwich Golf Club, which is one of the top 100 golf courses in America, is named after Old Sandwich Road.

References

Roads in Massachusetts
Plymouth, Massachusetts
Plymouth Colony